Thaine Morris is an American special and visual effects artist. He was nominated for an Academy Award in the category Best Visual Effects for the film Die Hard. Morris was hired as a chemist, after he graduated from college.

Selected filmography 
 Die Hard (1988; co-nominated with Richard Edlund, Al DiSarro and Brent Boates)

References

External links 

Living people
Place of birth missing (living people)
Year of birth missing (living people)
Visual effects artists
Special effects people
American chemists